Downtown: Life Under the Gun is the debut extended play (EP) by American singer August Alsina. The album was released on August 20, 2013, by Radio Killa Records and Def Jam Recordings. The album features guest appearances from Kidd Kidd, Trinidad James, Currensy and Rich Homie Quan. The album was supported by two official singles; "I Luv This Shit" and "Ghetto" featuring Rich Homie Quan.

Singles
On February 14, 2013, the music video was released for "I Luv This Shit" featuring Trinidad James. Five days later, "I Luv This Shit" was released for digital download. The song peaked at number 48 on the Billboard Hot 100 and number 13 on the Billboard Hot R&B/Hip-Hop Songs chart. On July 26, 2013, the music video was released for "Downtown" featuring Kidd Kidd. On August 13, 2013, the music video was released for "Let Me Hit That" featuring Currensy. On September 16, 2013, the music video was released for "Hell On Earth". On October 17, 2013, the music video was released for "Ghetto" featuring Rich Homie Quan. On December 9, 2013, the second single from the album, "Ghetto" featuring Rich Homie Quan was serviced to urban contemporary radio in the United States. It was later released for digital download on February 11, 2014. On December 31, 2013, the music video was released for "Don't Forget About Me".

Critical response

Andy Kellman of AllMusic said, "Although he now has as much arrogance as anyone else on contemporary R&B radio, his lingering pain remains, punctuated by a handful of between-song monologues that are all the more chilling for being expressed in a matter-of-fact tone. The gritty realism in ballads like "Hell on Earth" and "Nobody Knows" hints at future greatness. He's singing about his life, not romanticizing it."

Track listing

Charts

Weekly charts

Year-end charts

References

2013 debut EPs
Def Jam Recordings EPs